The canton of Avignon-Est is a French former administrative division in the department of Vaucluse and region Provence-Alpes-Côte d'Azur. It had 35,935 inhabitants (2012). It was disbanded following the French canton reorganisation which came into effect in March 2015.

Composition
The communes in the canton of Avignon-Est: 
 Avignon (partly, including Montfavet)
 Morières-lès-Avignon

References

Avignon-Est
Avignon
2015 disestablishments in France
States and territories disestablished in 2015